Gareth Owen (born 21 October 1971) is a Welsh former footballer, who played as a midfielder for various English and Welsh clubs between 1989 and 2011. He is currently the manager of Wrexham AFC Women Under 19s.

Career
Owen spent twelve years as a professional at Wrexham, and was rewarded by a testimonial match against Manchester United in 2000 which drew a crowd of 13,000 to the Racecourse Ground. He then spent two years at Doncaster Rovers before moving to Connah's Quay Nomads. He joined Airbus UK Broughton in August 2005 as Player-Manager.

In July 2008 he moved to Rhyl on a one-year deal to play under his former assistant manager at Airbus, Allan Bickerstaff. In May 2009 he was named as the Welsh Premier League's Player of the Season. He remained at the club for three years before returning to Airbus in June 2011 as head coach.

He also works in North Wales as Football Development Officer with Flintshire County Council, where one of key roles is to develop women's football in the region.

He was appointed head coach at Airbus UK in 2011 but left the club in January 2012 when Andy Preece's management team was appointed.

In the summer of 2021 Owen was appointed manager of Wrexham AFC Women's under-19s, guiding them to a league title in their first campaign.

International
Owen was capped by Wales at Under 21 level and 'B' international level. He was called up to the full international team in 1998 but did not play.

Honours

Player
Wrexham
Third Division runner-up: 1992–93

Welsh Cup: 1994–95; runner-up: 1990–91

FAW Premier Cup: 1997–98, 1999–2000, 2000–01

Rhyl
Welsh Premier League: 2008–09

Individual
PFA Team of the Year: 1992–93 Third Division
 Welsh Premier League Player of the Season: 2008–09
 Welsh Premier League Team of the Year: 2008–09.

Manager
Wrexham Women
Genaro Adran North U19: 2021–22

References

External links
Welsh Premier League profile

Living people
1971 births
English footballers
Welsh footballers
Wales under-21 international footballers
Association football midfielders
Wrexham A.F.C. players
Doncaster Rovers F.C. players
Rhyl F.C. players
English Football League players
Connah's Quay Nomads F.C. players
Airbus UK Broughton F.C. players
Airbus UK Broughton F.C. managers
Northwich Victoria F.C. players
Cymru Premier players
Cymru Premier managers
Rhyl F.C. managers
English football managers